Kougawa Dam is a dam in Kagoshima Prefecture, Japan, completed in 1973.

References 

Dams in Kagoshima Prefecture
Dams completed in 1973